James Frost (born 1986) is a Welsh musician.

James Frost may also refer to:

 James Frost (cement maker) (c. 1780–c. 1840), British manufacturer
 James Frost (video director) (born 1973), English video director
 James Arthur Frost (1918–2017), American historian
 James Bernard Frost, American author
 James Marion Frost (1848–1916), American Baptist preacher

See also
 Jack Frost (disambiguation)